This is a list of national, regional and local radio stations owned by the BBC in the United Kingdom.

List of national radio stations

FM, AM, DAB, TV and online platforms only

List of regional radio stations

Scotland
BBC Radio Scotland - A radio station for all things Scotland.
BBC Radio nan Gàidheal - A Scottish Gaelic language radio station.
BBC Radio Orkney - A part-time radio station for Orkney which opts out of Radio Scotland.
BBC Radio Shetland - A part-time radio station for Shetland which opts out of Radio Scotland.

Wales
BBC Radio Wales - A radio station for all things Wales.
BBC Radio Cymru - A Welsh language radio station.
BBC Radio Cymru 2 - A part-time Welsh language radio station which opts out at breakfast time from Radio Cymru.

Northern Ireland
BBC Radio Ulster - A radio station for all things Northern Ireland.
BBC Radio Foyle - A part-time station covering Derry which opts out of Radio Ulster.

List of local radio stations in England

East
BBC Essex
BBC Radio Cambridgeshire
BBC Radio Norfolk
BBC Radio Northampton
BBC Radio Suffolk
BBC Three Counties Radio

East Midlands
BBC Radio Derby
BBC Radio Leicester
BBC Radio Nottingham

London
BBC Radio London

North East & Cumbria
BBC Radio Newcastle
BBC Radio Cumbria
BBC Radio Tees

North West
BBC Radio Lancashire
BBC Radio Manchester
BBC Radio Merseyside

South
BBC Radio Berkshire
BBC Radio Oxford
BBC Radio Solent

South East
BBC Radio Kent
BBC Radio Surrey
BBC Radio Sussex

South West & Channel Islands
BBC Radio Cornwall
BBC Radio Devon
BBC Radio Guernsey
BBC Radio Jersey

West
BBC Radio Bristol
BBC Radio Gloucestershire
BBC Radio Somerset
BBC Radio Wiltshire

West Midlands
BBC CWR
BBC Hereford & Worcester
BBC Radio Shropshire
BBC Radio Stoke
BBC Radio WM

Yorkshire
BBC Radio Leeds
BBC Radio Sheffield
BBC Radio York

Yorkshire & Lincolnshire
BBC Radio Humberside
BBC Radio Lincolnshire

See also
BBC Local Radio
List of radio stations in the United Kingdom
List of Internet radio stations

External links 

BBC Radio
BBC
Radio stations